Dax Holt (August 3, 1982) is an American entertainment reporter, entertainment personality host, and entrepreneur. He was a TMZ on TV on-air correspondent for 11 years and is currently the co-founder of the fantasy football trophy company TrophySmack and a co-host of the Hollywood Raw Podcast.

Early life and education 
Dax was born in Denver, Colorado. Growing up, Dax was always drawn the entertainment world. Dax attended Santa Ana Community College where he spent the majority of his time involved in the TV news program and discovered his passion for being in front of the camera. While at Santa Ana Community College, he got an internship with Extra and found his passion for entertainment news.

Career 

Dax is best known for his work with TMZ, where he served as producer and on-air personality. Since his start, he has been featured in numerous TV spots and radio shows like On Air with Ryan Seacrest, Howard Stern, and Kevin & Bean and he has made appearances on American Idol.

TMZ 
In 2007, Dax joined TMZ and Founder Harvey Levin and quickly became one of the top on air-correspondents, breaking entertainment news stories, interviewing celebrities, and hosting additional TMZ shows like TMZ Live. While he working for TMZ, Dax's profile grew and he was eventually spoofed on SNL, was Punk’d by Ashton Kutcher, and was featured on the cover of J’Adore. During his time at TMZ, Dax also received two Daytime Emmy nominations as a producer in 2014 and 2016.

Straight From the Source 
Upon leaving TMZ, Dax began hosting an innovative celebrity talk show with the celebrity news YouTube channel Hollywood Pipeline called Straight From the Source. On the show, Dax interviewed many celebrities, such as Brian Austin Green.

Live With Kelly! 
In 2016, Dax took part in the contest "Live with Kelly and YOU" which was created to find Kelly Ripa's new co-host for Live with Kelly after the departure of Michael Strahan. Dax quickly became a fan favorite but at the end of the week long competition ended, Dax has come in second place.

Hollywood Raw podcast 
Since 2018, Dax has been a co-host of the Hollywood Raw Podcast alongside TMZ alum Adam Glyn started. The duo cover the latest in entertainment news, as well as talking to celebrities such as reality TV stars, political figures, social media influencers, and more, covering topics from their careers to what's happening in their life. The podcast is currently one of the top shows on the Hurrdat Media Network.

TrophySmack 
In 2021, Dax appeared on the popular entrepreneurial reality TV show Shark Tank to get a deal for his newest company, TrophySmack. Alongside co-founder and business partner, Matt Walsh, the pair landed a six-figure deal with famous Investor and Dallas Mavericks owner, Mark Cuban. The company specializes in customizable trophies, awards, and championship belts for fantasy football leagues.

Personal life 
Dax currently resides in Anaheim, California with his wife, Denise, and his two children. His daughter was actually the main subject of a viral video after she had gone to school and told teachers that the family was "growing weed" in the backyard, when in reality she was just talking about how the was grass growing.

External links 
 Official website
TrophySmack
Hollywood Raw Podcast

References 

1982 births
Living people